The first HMS Wessex (D43)  was a W-class destroyer of the British Royal Navy that saw service in the final months of World War I and the early months of World War II.

Construction and commissioning
Wessex was ordered on 9 December 1916 as part of the 10th Destroyer Order of the 1916–1917 Naval Programme and was laid down by Hawthorn Leslie and Company at Tyneside, England, on 25 May 1917. She was launched on 12 March 1918, completed on 11 May 1918, and commissioned the same day. She was assigned the pennant number F32 in June 1918; it was changed to D43 during the interwar period.

Service history

World War I
Wessex served in the Grand Fleet for the rest of World War I, and was in attendance at the surrender of the Imperial German Navys High Seas Fleet in November 1918.

Interwar
During the interwar period, Wessex served in the 6th Destroyer Flotilla in the Atlantic Fleet, and was one of four W-class destroyers (Wessex,  and ) taken out of reserve in 1923 and fitted with a prototype Sonar installation as the 11th Division of the 6th Flotilla. She later was assigned to duty with the Royal Navys torpedo school at Portsmouth, HMS Vernon.

World War II
She continued in this role until April 1940.

In April 1940, Wessex was reassigned under the Commander-in-Chief, The Nore for the support of the operations of Allied forces in France. After the successful German invasion of the Netherlands, Belgium, Luxembourg, and France began in May 1940, Wessex evacuated the British naval attaché Admiral Gerald Charles Dickens to the Netherlands from the Hook of Holland on 14 May 1940 and transported him to the United Kingdom. She then was reassigned under the Commander-in-Chief, Dover to support Allied forces opposing the German advance in Belgium and France.

They opened fire on a German armored column west of Calais at Sangatte Hill at 16:20 hours and received return fire from German artillery ashore. At 16:30 hours, 27 German Junkers Ju 87 Stuka dive bombers attacked the destroyers, hitting Wessex with three bombs. Vimiera rescued her survivors but had to withdraw with damage from six near misses. The German aircraft then concentrated their attack on Burza, which suffered heavy damage from two bomb hits and three near misses but managed to limp back to Dover with Vimiera. The ships shot down one German aircraft during the action.

Notes

Bibliography
 
 
 
 
 
 
 

 
 
 
 
 
 

 

V and W-class destroyers of the Royal Navy
Ships built on the River Tyne
1918 ships
World War I destroyers of the United Kingdom
World War II destroyers of the United Kingdom
World War II shipwrecks in the North Sea
Maritime incidents in May 1940
Ships sunk by German aircraft
Destroyers sunk by aircraft